Gu Sa-maeng (Hangul: 구사맹, Hanja: 具思孟; 1531–1604) was a 16th century Korean nobleman, military officer and minister. He was the father of Queen Inheon and the maternal grandfather of Injo of Joseon.

Life
In 1549 (4th year of King Myeongjong), Gu Sa-maeng was appointed as Jinsa (진사). In 1558, at 27 years old he passed the national examination as a military officer and worked in Seungmunwon (승문원, 承文院) as an inspector.

In 1560, he become a general and three years later, he went to the Ming Dynasty as the secretary of Saeun Temple. He spent the following years as Ijojwarang (이조좌랑) and Ijojeongnang (이조정랑).

In 1567 after King Myeongjong's death, Gu become Binjeondogamjejo (빈전도감제조, 殯殿都監提調). Two years later, in 1569 (2nd year of King Seonjo's reign), he was appointed as the Governor of Hwanghae Province.

In 1587, one of his youngest daughters married Grand Prince Jeongwon, the son of King Seonjo, and became the mother to three sons; one of them becoming the future king.

From then on, he started to serve in numerous government posts in the central and local areas during the reign of Seonjo of Joseon. Meanwhile, during the Imjin War (임진왜란), in 1597 (30th year of King Seonjo's reign), Gu served some of the Royal Princes. At this time, he was a Right Chamchan (2nd senior rank; 우참찬, 右參贊).

Gu Sa-maeng died on April 1, 1604 (37th year of King Seonjo's reign), at the age of 74 years old due to the relapse of his chronic disease, which had plagued him since he was working in the Uigeumbu.

After his grandson ascended the throne as King Injo, along with posthumously honouring his parents as King and Queen, he also honoured his maternal grandfather as Internal Prince Neungan (능안부원군, 綾安府院君).

It was said that in Gu's eulogy, it was written that he was a simple and quiet man by nature, and also liked frugality. So he didn't own land or a house, but only enjoyed his coat of arms ("천성이 담백하고 조용하였으며, 검소한 것을 좋아하여 땅이나 집을 장만하지 않고 오로지 문장을 즐겼다.").

His tomb is located in Namyangju, Gyeonggi Province, along with his two wives, Lady Han (한씨) and Lady Shin (신씨).

Books
There are two books written by Gu Sa-maeng:
 Yuhuichun (유희춘, 柳希春)
 Yihwang (이황, 李滉)

Family
Great-great-grandfather
 Gu Chi-hong (구치홍, 具致洪) (1421 — 1507)
Great-grandfather
 Gu Su-yeong (구수영, 具壽永) (1456 — 1523)
 Great-grandmother
 Yi Eok-cheon, Princess Gilan (길안현주, 이억천 정경부인 이씨) (July 1457 — October 1519)
Grandfather
 Gu Hui-gyeong (구희경, 具希璟)
 Grandmother
  Lady Shin of the Geochang Shin clan (신씨)
 Father - Gu Sun (구순, 具淳/具諄) (1507 — 1551)
 Uncle - Gu Jun (구준, 具準)
 Mother - Lady Yi of the Jeonju Yi clan (전주 이씨)
 Grandfather - Yi Jing-won, Prince Uisin (이징원 의신군) (1492 - ?)
 Grandmother - Princess Consort Changnyeong of the Jeonui Lee clan (창녕현부인 전의 이씨, 全義 李氏); daughter of Lee Myeong-pil (이명필, 李明弼)
 Step-Grandmother - Princess Consort Taein of the Eonyang Kim clan (태인현부인 언양 김씨, 彦陽 金氏); daughter of Kim Yeong-nyeon (김영년, 金永年)
Sibling(s)
 Older brother - Gu Sa-an (구사안, 具思顔; 1523–1562)
Sister-in-law - Princess Hyosun (효순공주; 1522–1538)
 Adoptive Nephew - Gu Hong (구홍, 具弘)
 Adoptive Grandnephew - Gu In-hu, Internal Prince Neungcheon (구인후 능천부원군, 具仁垕 綾川府院君) (1578 - 1658)
 Adoptive Grandniece-in-law - Lady Hwang (황씨, 黃氏); daughter of Hwang Chan (황찬, 黃璨)
 Adoptive Great-Grandniece - Lady Gu (구씨, 具氏)
 Adoptive Great-Grandnephew-in-law - Han Jin-dal (한진달, 韓振達)
 Adoptive Grandniece-in-law - Lady Lee (이씨, 李氏); daughter of Lee Yeong-hang (이영항, 李永恒)
 Adoptive Great-Grandnephew - Gu Mun-je (구문제, 具文濟)
 Adoptive Great-Grandnephew - Gu Mun-chi (구문치, 具文治)
 Adoptive Great-Grandniece-in-law - Lady Park Seung-ji (박승지, 朴承旨)
 Adoptive Great-Great-Grandnephew - Gu Oh (구오, 具鏊)
 Unnamed Adoptive Great-Grandniece-in-law
 Adoptive Great-Great-Grandnephew - Gu Heum (구흠, 具欽)
 Adoptive Great-Great-Grandnephew - Gu Hoeng (구횡, 具鐄) (1538 - ?)
Wives and their issue:
 Internal Princess Consort Seowon of the Cheongju Han clan (서원부부인 청주 한씨) – No issue.
 Internal Princess Consort Pyeongsan of the Pyeongsan Shin clan (평산부부인 평산 신씨; 1538–1622)
 Son – Gu Seong (구성, 具宬) (1558 – 1618)
 Daughter-in-law – Lady Jeong (정씨, 鄭氏)
 Grandson – Gu In-gi (구인기, 具仁基)
 Grandson – Gu In-hu, Internal Prince Neungcheon (구인후 능천부원군, 具仁垕 綾川府院君) (1578 - 1658); became the adoptive son of Gu Hong (구홍, 具弘)
Granddaughter-in-law - Lady Hwang (황씨, 黃氏); daughter of Hwang Chan (황찬, 黃璨)
Great-Granddaughter - Lady Gu (구씨, 具氏)
 Great grandson-in-law - Han Jin-dal (한진달, 韓振達)
 Granddaughter-in-law - Lady Lee (이씨, 李氏); daughter of Lee Yeong-hang (이영항, 李永恒)
Grandson - Gu Mun-je (구문제, 具文濟)
 Grandson - Gu Mun-chi (구문치, 具文治)
 Granddaughter-in-law - Lady Park Seung-ji (박승지, 朴承旨)
 Adoptive great-grandson - Gu Oh (구오, 具鏊)
 Unnamed granddaughter-in-law
 Great-grandson - Gu Heum (구흠, 具欽)
 Great-Grandson - Gu Hoeng (구횡, 具鐄) (1538 - ?)
 Grandson – Gu In-hak (구인학, 具仁壆)
 Granddaughter - Lady Gu (구씨, 具氏)
 Grandson-in-law - Yi Ho, Prince Punghae (풍해군 이호)
 Granddaughter – Lady Gu (구씨, 具氏)
 Grandson-in-law - Yu Chung-geol (유충걸, 柳忠傑)
 Granddaughter – Lady Gu (구씨, 具氏)
 Grandson-in-law - Park Rin (박린, 朴潾)
 Son  – Gu Hong (구홍, 具宖)
 Son - Gu Yong (구용, 具容) (1569 – 1601)
 Grandson – Gu In-jong (구인중, 具仁重)
 Granddaughter – Lady Gu (구씨, 具氏)
 Grandson-in-law - Kim Shin (김신, 金愼)
 Daughter – Lady Gu (구씨, 具氏)
 Son-in-law – Sim Eom (심엄, 沈㤿)
 Unnamed grandson
 Unnamed grandson
 Unnamed grandson
 Unnamed grandson
 Unnamed grandson
 Unnamed grandson
 Unnamed grandson
 Granddaughter – Lady Sim of the Cheongsong Sim clan (청송 심씨, 靑松 沈氏)
 Granddaughter – Lady Sim of the Cheongsong Sim clan (청송 심씨, 靑松 沈氏)
 Granddaughter – Lady Sim of the Cheongsong Sim clan (청송 심씨, 靑松 沈氏)
 Granddaughter – Lady Sim of the Cheongsong Sim clan (청송 심씨, 靑松 沈氏)
 Daughter – Lady Gu (구씨, 具氏)
 Son-in-law – Hong Hui (홍희, 洪憙)
 Unnamed grandson
 Unnamed grandson
 Unnamed grandson
 Granddaughter – Lady Hong
 Daughter – Lady Gu (구씨, 具氏)
 Son-in-law – Gwon Yu-nam (권유남, 權裕男)
 Unnamed grandson
 Granddaughter – Lady Gwon
 Daughter – Lady Gu (구씨, 具氏)
 Son-in-law – Kim Deok-mang (김덕망, 金德望)
 Unnamed grandson
 Unnamed grandson
 Unnamed grandson
 Unnamed grandson
 Unnamed grandson 
 Granddaughter – Lady Kim
 Granddaughter – Lady Kim
 Granddaughter – Lady Kim
 Granddaughter – Lady Kim
 Granddaughter – Lady Kim
 Son – Gu Gwing (구굉, 具宖) (1577 – 1562)
 Grandson – Gu In-gi (구인기, 具仁墍) (1597 – 1676)
 Granddaughter – Lady Gu (구씨, 具氏)
 Grandson-in-law - Lee Ip-shin (이입신, 李立身)
 Granddaughter – Lady Gu (구씨, 具氏)
 Grandson-in-law - Yu Gu (유구, 柳䪷)
 Daughter - Queen Inheon of the Neungseong Gu clan (인헌왕후 구씨) (23 May 1578 – 10 February 1626)
 Son-in-law - Wonjong of Joseon (조선 원종) (2 August 1580 – 2 February 1620)
 Grandson - Yi Jong, King Injo (이종 조선 인조) (7 December 1595 - 17 June 1649)
 Grandson - Yi Bo, Grand Prince Neungwon (이보 능원대군) (15 May 1598 – 26 January 1656)
 Grandson - Yi Jeon, Grand Prince Neungchang (이전 능창대군) (16 July 1599 – 17 November 1615)
 Daughter - Lady Gu (구씨, 具氏)
 Son-in-law - Yi Bak (이박, 李璞)

References

External links
Gu Sa-maeng on Encykorea .
Gu Sa-maeng on Doosan Encyclopedia .

1531 births
1604 deaths
Joseon scholar-officials
16th-century Korean people
Neungseong Gu clan
17th-century Korean people